Parkwood light rail station is located on the corner of Napper Road and Smith Street Motorway in the Gold Coast suburb of Parkwood. The station is part of the Gold Coast's G:link light rail network and provides a 'park and ride' facilities for up to 1000 vehicles. Parkwood light rail station opened for service on 17 December 2017 when the extension to Helensvale was completed.

Location 
Below is a map of the local area. The station can be identified by the grey marker.{
  "type": "FeatureCollection",
  "features": [
    {
      "type": "Feature",
      "properties": {},
      "geometry": {
        "type": "Point",
        "coordinates": [
          153.34718406200412,
          -27.951869627972258
        ]
      }
    }
  ]
}

References

External links 

 G:link

G:link stations
Railway stations in Australia opened in 2017
Public transport on the Gold Coast, Queensland